Clarke College may refer to:

Clarke College, the former name of Clarke University, a Roman Catholic institution in Dubuque, Iowa
Clarke College, a Mississippi Baptist institution which merged into Mississippi College during 1981–1991
William Clarke College, an Anglican K-12 school in Sydney, New South Wales, Australia, founded in 1988